Jogaila (1 June 1434), later Władysław II Jagiełło, was Grand Duke of Lithuania (1377–1434) and then King of Poland (1386–1434), first alongside his wife Jadwiga until 1399, and then sole ruler of Poland. Born a pagan, he converted to Catholicism in 1386 and was baptized as Ladislaus in Kraków, married the young Queen Jadwiga, and was crowned King of Poland as Władysław II Jagiełło. In 1387, he converted Lithuania to Catholicism. His own reign in Poland started in 1399, upon the death of Queen Jadwiga, lasted a further thirty-five years, and laid the foundation for the centuries-long Polish–Lithuanian union. He was a member of the Jagiellonian dynasty in Poland that bears his name and was previously also known as the Gediminid dynasty in the Grand Duchy of Lithuania. The dynasty ruled both states until 1572, and became one of the most influential dynasties in late medieval and early modern Europe. During his reign, the Polish-Lithuanian state was the largest state in the Christian world.

Jogaila was the last pagan ruler of medieval Lithuania. After he became King of Poland, as a result of the Union of Krewo, the newly formed Polish-Lithuanian union confronted the growing power of the Teutonic Order. The allied victory at the Battle of Grunwald in 1410, followed by the Peace of Thorn, secured the Polish and Lithuanian borders and marked the emergence of the Polish–Lithuanian alliance as a significant force in Europe. The reign of Władysław II Jagiełło extended Polish frontiers and is often considered the beginning of Poland's Golden Age.

Early life

Lithuania
Little is known of Jogaila's early life, and even his year of birth is uncertain. Previously historians assumed he was born in 1352, but some recent research suggests a later date—about 1362. He was a descendant of the Gediminid dynasty and was the son of Algirdas, Grand Duke of Lithuania, and his second wife, Uliana of Tver, who was the daughter of the Rurikid prince Alexander of Tver. His name had a meaning of more courageous and superior than others, he spent most of his early time in Vilnius, at his father's manor.

The Grand Duchy of Lithuania to which Jogaila succeeded as Grand Duke in 1377 was a political entity composed of two leading, but very different nationalities and two political systems: ethnic Lithuania in the north-west and the vast Ruthenian territories of former Kievan Rus', comprising the lands of modern Ukraine, Belarus, and parts of western Russia. At first, Jogaila—like his father—based his rule in the southern and eastern territories of Lithuania, while his uncle, Kęstutis, the Duke of Trakai, continued to rule the north-western region. Jogaila's succession, however, soon placed this system of dual rule under strain.

At the start of his reign, Jogaila was preoccupied with unrest in the Lithuanian Rus' lands. In 1377–78, Andrei of Polotsk, the eldest son of Algirdas, challenged Jogaila's authority and sought to become Grand Duke. In 1380, Andrei and another brother, Dmitry, sided with Prince Dmitri of Moscow against Jogaila's alliance with emir Mamai, de facto khan of the Golden Horde. Jogaila failed to support Mamai, lingering in the vicinity of the battlefield, which led to Mamai's army's significant defeat at the hands of Prince Dmitri in the Battle of Kulikovo. The Muscovites' Pyrrhic victory over the Golden Horde, in the long term, signified, however, the beginning of a slow climb to power by the Grand Duchy of Moscow, which became within a century the most serious rival and threat to the integrity, well-being and survival of Lithuania. However, in 1380 Muscovy was greatly weakened by tremendous losses suffered during the battle and thus, in the same year, Jogaila was free to begin a struggle for supremacy with Kęstutis.

In the north-west, Lithuania faced constant armed incursions from the Teutonic Knights—founded after 1226 to fight and convert the pagan Baltic tribes of Prussians, Yotvingians and Lithuanians. In 1380, Jogaila concluded the secret Treaty of Dovydiškės, directed against Kęstutis. When Kęstutis discovered the plan, the Lithuanian Civil War began. He seized Vilnius, overthrew Jogaila, and pronounced himself grand duke in his place. In 1382, Jogaila raised an army from his father's vassals and confronted Kęstutis near Trakai. Kęstutis and his son Vytautas entered Jogaila's encampment for negotiations but were tricked and imprisoned in the Kreva Castle, where Kęstutis was found dead, probably murdered, a week later. Vytautas escaped to the Teutonic fortress of Marienburg and was baptised there under the name Wigand.

Jogaila formulated the Treaty of Dubysa, which rewarded the Knights for their aid in defeating Kęstutis and Vytautas by promising Christianisation and granting them Samogitia west of the Dubysa river. However, when Jogaila failed to ratify the treaty, the Knights invaded Lithuania in the summer of 1383. In 1384, Jogaila reconciled with Vytautas promising to return his patrimony in Trakai. Vytautas then turned against the Knights, attacking and looting several Prussian castles.

It is known that Jogaila, being ethnic Lithuanian by the man's line, himself knew and spoke in the Lithuanian language with Vytautas, his cousin from the Gediminids dynasty. Also, during the Christianization of Samogitia, none of the clergy, who came to Samogitia with Jogaila, were able to communicate with the natives, therefore Jogaila himself taught the Samogitians about the Catholicism, thus he was able to communicate in the Samogitian dialect of the Lithuanian language. According to the Teutonic Order's testimonial, he could not read nor write, and had to listen to others reading for him.

Baptism and marriage

Jogaila's Russian mother Uliana of Tver urged him to marry Sofia, daughter of Prince Dmitri of Moscow, who required him first to convert to Orthodoxy. That option, however, was unlikely to halt the crusades against Lithuania by the Teutonic Knights, who regarded Orthodox Christians as schismatics and little better than heathens. Jogaila chose therefore to accept a Polish proposal to become a Catholic and marry the eleven-year-old Queen Jadwiga of Poland. The nobles of Lesser Poland made this offer to Jogaila for many reasons. They wanted to neutralize the dangers posed by Lithuania itself and to secure the fertile territories of Galicia–Volhynia. The Polish nobles saw the offer as an opportunity for increasing their privileges and avoiding Austrian influence, brought by Jadwiga's previous fiancé William, Duke of Austria.

On 14 August 1385 in Kreva Castle, Jogaila confirmed his prenuptial promises in the Union of Krewo (Union of Kreva). The promises included the adoption of Christianity, repatriation of lands "stolen" from Poland by its neighbours, and terras suas Lithuaniae et Russiae Coronae Regni Poloniae perpetuo applicare, a clause interpreted by historians to mean anything from a personal union between Lithuania and Poland to a complete incorporation of Lithuania into Poland. The agreement at Kreva has been described both as far-sighted and as a desperate gamble.

Jogaila was duly baptised at the Wawel Cathedral in Kraków on 15 February 1386 and from then on formally used the name Władysław or Latin versions of it. The marriage took place three days later, and on 4 March 1386 Jogaila was crowned King Władysław by archbishop Bodzanta. He was also to be legally adopted by Jadwiga's mother, Elizabeth of Bosnia, so retaining the throne in the event of Jadwiga's death. He was the first Lithuanian to be crowned as the King of Poland. The royal baptism triggered the conversion of most of Jogaila's court and noblemen, as well as mass baptisms in Lithuanian rivers, a beginning of the final Christianization of Lithuania. Though the ethnic Lithuanian nobility were the main converts to Catholicism—both paganism and the Orthodox rite remained strong among the peasants—the king's conversion and its political implications created lasting repercussions for the history of both Lithuania and Poland. On 22 February 1387, he banned Catholics from marriages with Orthodox, and demanded those Orthodox who previously married with the Catholics to convert to Catholicism.

Ruler of Lithuania and Poland

Accession

Władysław II Jagiello and Jadwiga reigned as co-monarchs; and though Jadwiga probably had little real power, she took an active part in Poland's political and cultural life. In 1387, she led two successful military expeditions to Red Ruthenia, recovered lands her father, Louis I of Hungary, had transferred from Poland to Hungary, and secured the homage of Voivode Petru I of Moldavia. In 1390, she also personally opened negotiations with the Teutonic Order. Most political responsibilities, however, fell to Jagiello, with Jadwiga attending to the cultural and charitable activities for which she is still revered.

Soon after Jagiello's accession to the Polish throne, Jagiello granted Vilnius a city charter like that of Kraków, modeled on the Magdeburg Law; and Vytautas issued a privilege to a Jewish commune of Trakai on almost the same terms as privileges issued to the Jews of Poland in the reigns of Boleslaus the Pious and Casimir the Great. Władysław's policy of unifying the two legal systems was partial and uneven at first but achieved a lasting influence. By the time of the Union of Lublin in 1569, there was not much difference between the administrative and judicial systems in force in Lithuania and Poland.

One effect of Jagiello's measures was to be the advancement of Catholics in Lithuania at the expense of Orthodox elements; in 1387 and 1413, for example, Lithuanian Catholic boyars were granted special judicial and political privileges denied to the Orthodox boyars. As this process gained momentum, it was accompanied by the rise of both Rus' and Lithuanian identity in the fifteenth century.

Challenges

Jagiello's baptism failed to end the crusade of the Teutonic Knights, who claimed his conversion was a sham, perhaps even a heresy, and renewed their incursions on the pretext that pagans remained in Lithuania. From then on, however, the Order found it harder to sustain the cause of a crusade and faced the growing threat to its existence posed by the Kingdom of Poland and a genuinely Christian Lithuania alliance. Władysław sponsored the creation of the diocese of Vilnius under bishop Andrzej Wasilko, the former confessor of Elizabeth of Poland. The bishopric, which included Samogitia, then largely controlled by the Teutonic Order, was subordinated to the see of Gniezno and not to that of Teutonic Königsberg. The decision may not have improved Władysław's relations with the Order, but it served to introduce closer ties between Lithuania and Poland, enabling the Polish church to freely assist its Lithuanian counterpart.

In 1389, Władysław's rule in Lithuania faced a revived challenge from Vytautas, who resented the power given to Skirgaila in Lithuania at the expense of his own patrimony. Vytautas started a civil war in Lithuania, aiming to become the Grand Duke. On 4 September 1390, the joint forces of Vytautas and Grand Master Konrad von Wallenrode of the Teutonic Order, laid siege to Vilnius, which was held by Władysław's regent Skirgaila with combined Polish, Lithuanian and Ruthenian troops. Although the Knights lifted the siege of the castle after a month, they reduced much of the outer city to ruins. This bloody conflict was eventually brought to a temporary halt in 1392 with the Treaty of Ostrów, by which Władysław handed over the government of Lithuania to his cousin in exchange for peace: Vytautas was to rule Lithuania as the grand duke (magnus dux) until his death, under the overlordship of the Supreme Duke (dux supremus) in the person of the Polish monarch. Skirgaila was moved from the Duchy of Trakai to become prince of Kiev. Vytautas initially accepted his status but soon began to pursue Lithuania's independence from Poland.

The protracted period of war between the Lithuanians and the Teutonic Knights was ended on 12 October 1398 by the Treaty of Salynas, named after the islet in the Neman River where it was signed. Lithuania agreed to cede Samogitia and assist the Teutonic Order in a campaign to seize Pskov, while the Order agreed to assist Lithuania in a campaign to seize Novgorod. Shortly afterwards, Vytautas was crowned as a king by local nobles; but the following year his forces and those of his ally, Khan Tokhtamysh of the White Horde, were crushed by the Timurids at the Battle of the Vorskla River, ending his imperial ambitions in the east and obliging him to submit to Władysław's protection once more.

King of Poland

Early actions

On 22 June 1399, Jadwiga gave birth to a daughter, baptised Elizabeth Bonifacia, but within a month the mother and daughter died, leaving Władysław sole ruler of the Kingdom of Poland and without an heir nor much legitimacy to rule the kingdom. Jadwiga's death undermined Władysław's right to the throne, and as a result old conflicts between the nobility of Lesser Poland, generally sympathetic to Władysław, and the gentry of Greater Poland began to surface. In 1402, Władysław answered the rumblings against his rule by marrying Anna of Celje, a granddaughter of Casimir III of Poland, a political match that re-legitimised his reign.

The Union of Vilnius and Radom of 1401 confirmed the status of Vytautas as grand duke under Władysław's overlordship, while assuring the title of grand duke to the heirs of Władysław rather than those of Vytautas: should Władysław die without heirs, the Lithuanian boyars were to elect a new monarch. Since no heir had yet been produced by either monarch, the implications of the union were unforeseeable, but it forged bonds between the Polish and Lithuanian nobility and a permanent defensive alliance between the two states, strengthening Lithuania's hand for a new war against the Teutonic Order in which Poland officially took no part. While the document left the liberties of the Polish nobles untouched, it granted increased power to the boyars of Lithuania, whose grand dukes had till then been unencumbered by checks and balances of the sort attached to the Polish monarchy. The Union of Vilnius and Radom therefore earned Władysław a measure of support in Lithuania.

In late 1401, the new war against the Order overstretched the resources of the Lithuanians, who found themselves fighting on two fronts after uprisings in the eastern provinces. Another of Władysław's brothers, the malcontent Švitrigaila, chose this moment to stir up revolts behind the lines and declare himself grand duke. On 31 January 1402, he presented himself in Marienburg, where he won the backing of the Knights with concessions similar to those made by Jogaila and Vytautas during earlier leadership contests in the Grand Duchy.

Against the Teutonic Order

The war ended in the Treaty of Raciąż on 22 May 1404. Władysław acceded to the formal cession of Samogitia and agreed to support the Order's designs on Pskov; in return, Konrad von Jungingen undertook to sell Poland the disputed Dobrzyń Land and the town of Złotoryja, once pawned to the Order by Władysław Opolski, and to support Vytautas in a revived attempt on Novgorod. Both sides had practical reasons for signing the treaty at that point: the Order needed time to fortify its newly acquired lands, the Poles and Lithuanians to deal with territorial challenges in the east and in Silesia.

Also in 1404, Władysław held talks at Vratislav with Wenceslaus IV of Bohemia, who offered to return Silesia to Poland if Władysław supported him in his power struggle within the Holy Roman Empire. Władysław turned the deal down with the agreement of both Polish and Silesian nobles, unwilling to burden himself with new military commitments in the west.

Polish–Lithuanian–Teutonic war

In December 1408, Władysław and Vytautas held strategic talks in Navahrudak Castle, where they decided to foment a Samogitian uprising against Teutonic rule to draw German forces away from Pomerelia. Władysław promised to repay Vytautas for his support by restoring Samogitia to Lithuania in any future peace treaty. The uprising, which began in May 1409, at first provoked little reaction from the Knights, who had not yet consolidated their rule in Samogitia by building castles; but by June their diplomats were busy lobbying Władysław's court at Oborniki, warning his nobles against Polish involvement in a war between Lithuania and the Order. Władysław, however, bypassed his nobles and informed new Grand Master Ulrich von Jungingen that if the Knights acted to suppress Samogitia, Poland would intervene. This stung the Order into issuing a declaration of war against Poland on 6 August, which Władysław received on 14 August in Nowy Korczyn.

The castles guarding the northern border were in such bad condition that the Knights easily captured those at Złotoryja, Dobrzyń and Bobrowniki, the capital of Dobrzyń Land, while German burghers invited them into Bydgoszcz (German: Bromberg). Władysław arrived on the scene in late September, retook Bydgoszcz within a week, and came to terms with the Order on 8 October. During the winter, the two armies prepared for a major confrontation. Władysław installed a strategic supply depot at Płock in Masovia and had a pontoon bridge constructed and transported north down the Vistula.

Meanwhile, both sides unleashed diplomatic offensives. The Knights dispatched letters to the monarchs of Europe, preaching their usual crusade against the heathens; Władysław countered with his own letters to the monarchs, accusing the Order of planning to conquer the whole world. Such appeals successfully recruited many foreign knights to each side. Wenceslas IV of Bohemia signed a defensive treaty with the Poles against the Teutonic Order; his brother, Sigismund of Luxembourg, allied himself with the Order and declared war against Poland on 12 July, though his Hungarian vassals refused his call to arms.

Battle of Grunwald

When the war resumed in June 1410, Władysław advanced into the Teutonic heartland at the head of an army of about 20,000 mounted nobles, 15,000 armed commoners, and 2,000 professional cavalry mainly hired from Bohemia. After crossing the Vistula over the pontoon bridge at Czerwińsk, his troops met up with those of Vytautas, whose 11,000 light cavalry included Lithuanians, Ruthenians, and Tatars. The Teutonic Order's army numbered about 18,000 cavalry, mostly Germans, and 5,000 infantry. On 15 July, at the Battle of Grunwald after one of the largest and most ferocious battles of the Middle Ages, the allies won a victory so overwhelming that the Teutonic Order's army was virtually annihilated, with most of its key commanders killed in combat, including Grand Master Ulrich von Jungingen and Grand Marshal Friedrich von Wallenrode. Thousands of troops were reported to have been slaughtered on either side.

The road to the Teutonic capital Marienburg now lay open, the city undefended; but for reasons the sources do not explain, Władysław hesitated to pursue his advantage. On 17 July, his army began a laboured advance, arriving at Marienburg only on 25 July, by which time the new Grand Master, Heinrich von Plauen, had organised a defence of the fortress. The apparent half-heartedness of the ensuing siege, called off by Władysław on 19 September, has been ascribed variously to the impregnability of the fortifications, to high casualty figures among the Lithuanians, to Władysław's unwillingness to risk further casualties, or to his desire to keep the Order weakened but undefeated as to not upset the balance of power between Poland (which would most likely acquire most of the Order possessions if it was totally defeated) and Lithuania; but a lack of sources precludes a definitive explanation.

Dissent

The war ended in 1411 with the Peace of Thorn, in which neither Poland nor Lithuania drove home their negotiating advantage to the full, much to the discontent of the Polish nobles. Poland regained Dobrzyń Land, Lithuania regained Samogitia, and Masovia regained a small territory beyond the Wkra river. Most of the Teutonic Order's territory, however, including towns that had surrendered, remained intact. Władysław then proceeded to release many high-ranking Teutonic Knights and officials for apparently modest ransoms. The cumulative expense of the ransoms, however, proved a drain on the Order's resources. This failure to exploit the victory to his nobles' satisfaction provoked growing opposition to Władysław's regime after 1411, further fuelled by the granting of Podolia, disputed between Poland and Lithuania, to Vytautas, and by the king's two-year absence in Lithuania.

In an effort to outflank his critics, Władysław promoted the leader of the opposing faction, bishop Mikołaj Trąba, to the archbishopric of Gniezno in autumn 1411 and replaced him in Kraków with Wojciech Jastrzębiec, a supporter of Vytautas. He also sought to create more allies in Lithuania. In the Union of Horodło, signed on 2 October 1413, he decreed that the status of the Grand Duchy of Lithuania was "tied to our Kingdom of Poland permanently and irreversibly" and granted the Catholic nobles of Lithuania privileges equal to those of the Polish szlachta. The act included a clause prohibiting the Polish nobles from electing a monarch without the consent of the Lithuanian nobles, and the Lithuanian nobles from electing a grand duke without the consent of the Polish monarch.

Last conflicts
In 1414, a sporadic new war broke out, known as the "Hunger War" from the Knights' scorched-earth tactics of burning fields and mills; but both the Knights and the Lithuanians were too exhausted from the previous war to risk a major battle, and the fighting petered out in the autumn. Hostilities did not flare up again until 1419, during the Council of Constance, when they were called off at the papal legate's insistence.

The Council of Constance proved a turning point in the Teutonic crusades, as it did for several European conflicts. Vytautas sent a delegation in 1415, including the metropolitan of Kiev and Samogitian witnesses; they arrived at Constance at the end of that year to express their preference for being "baptised with water and not with blood". The Polish envoys, among them Mikołaj Trąba, Zawisza Czarny, and Paweł Włodkowic, lobbied for an end to the forced conversion of heathens and to the Order's aggression against Lithuania and Poland. As a result of the Polish–Lithuanian diplomacy, the council, though scandalised by Włodkowic's questioning of the legitimacy of the monastic state, denied the Order's request for a further crusade and instead entrusted the conversion of the Samogitians to Poland–Lithuania.

The diplomatic context at Constance included the revolt of the Bohemian Hussites, who looked upon Poland as an ally in their wars against Sigismund, the emperor elect and new king of Bohemia. In 1421, the Bohemian Diet declared Sigismund deposed and formally offered the crown to Władysław on condition that he accept the religious principles of the Four Articles of Prague, which he was not prepared to do. After Władysław's refusal, Vytautas was postulated (elected in absentia) as Bohemian king, but he assured the pope that he opposed the heretics. Between 1422 and 1428, Władysław's nephew, Sigismund Korybut, attempted a regency in war-torn Bohemia, with little success. Vytautas accepted Sigismund's offer of a royal crown in 1429—apparently with Władysław's blessing—but Polish forces intercepted the crown in transit and the coronation was cancelled.

In 1422, Władysław fought another war, known as the Gollub War, against the Teutonic Order, defeating them in under two months before the Order's imperial reinforcements had time to arrive. The resulting Treaty of Melno ended the Knights' claims to Samogitia once and for all and defined a permanent border between Prussia and Lithuania. Lithuania was given the province of Samogitia, with the port of Palanga, but the city of Klaipėda was left to the Order. This border remained largely unchanged for roughly 500 years, until 1920. The terms of this treaty have, however, been seen as turning a Polish victory into defeat, as a result of Władysław's renunciation of Polish claims to Pomerania, Pomerelia, and Chełmno Land, for which he received only the town of Nieszawa in return. The Treaty of Melno closed a chapter in the Knights' wars with Lithuania but did little to settle their long-term issues with Poland. Further sporadic warfare broke out between Poland and the Knights between 1431 and 1435.

Cracks in the cooperation between Poland and Lithuania after the death of Vytautas in 1430 had offered the Knights a revived opportunity for interference in Poland. Władysław supported his brother Švitrigaila as grand duke of Lithuania, but when Švitrigaila, with the support of the Teutonic Order and dissatisfied Rus' nobles, rebelled against Polish overlordship in Lithuania, the Poles, under the leadership of Bishop Zbigniew Oleśnicki of Kraków, occupied Podolia, which Władysław had awarded to Lithuania in 1411, and Volhynia. In 1432, a pro-Polish party in Lithuania elected Vytautas's brother Žygimantas as grand duke, leading to an armed struggle over the Lithuanian succession which stuttered on for years after Władysław's death.

Succession and death

At the dying request of the childless Jadwiga he married a Styrian lady, Anna of Celje. She died in 1416, leaving a daughter : 
 Hedwig (1408–1431). 
In 1417, Władysław married Elisabeth of Pilica, who died in 1420 without bearing him a child. 
Two years later, he married Lithuanian noblewoman Sophia of Halshany (niece of Uliana Olshanska), who bore him two surviving sons : 
Władysław (1424–1444)
Casimir (1427–1492). 
The death in 1431 of his daughter Hedwig (Jadwiga), the last heir of Piast blood, released Władysław to make his sons by Sophia of Halshany his heirs, though he had to placate the Polish nobility with concessions to ensure their agreement, since the monarchy was elective. In 1427 the Polish nobles had initiated an anti-Jagiellonian movement, seeking to have Władysław and Casimir excluded from the Polish throne as they had no blood link to the previous ruling Polish dynasty, the Piasts.

During an excursion into Przemyśl Land in the 48th year of his reign, Władysław caught a cold from which he was unable to recover. He finally died in Grodek in 1434, leaving Poland to his elder son, Władysław III, and Lithuania to his younger, Casimir, both still minors at the time. The Lithuanian inheritance, however, could not be taken for granted. Władysław's death ended the personal union between the two realms, and it was not clear what would take its place.

Legacy

Władysław is depicted on the obverse of the modernized 100 Polish złoty banknote.

The Jagiełło Oak, an ancient tree in Białowieża Forest, is named in honour of the fact that he initiated the tradition of royal hunting in the area.

In 2021, asteroid 2004 TP17 was officially named as Jogaila (the Lithuanian language variant of his name).

Gallery

Family tree

See also
 History of Lithuania
 History of Poland (1385–1569)
 Names and titles of Władysław II Jagiełło
  for Jovian asteroid 202093 Jogaila
 List of Lithuanian rulers
 King Jagiello Monument
 List of Poles

Notes

Footnotes

References

 
 
 
 
 
 
 
 
 
 
 
 
  
 
 
 
 
 
 
 
 
 
 
 
 
 
 
 
 
 
 
 
 
 
 

14th-century births
1434 deaths
Year of birth uncertain
14th-century Polish monarchs
15th-century Polish monarchs
Burials at Wawel Cathedral
Converts to Roman Catholicism from pagan religions
Gediminids
Grand Dukes of Lithuania
Jagiellonian dynasty
Jure uxoris kings
Lithuanian former pagans
Lithuanian Roman Catholics
Order of the Dragon
People from Vilnius
People in the Battle of Grunwald
Polish Roman Catholics
Lithuanian monarchy